Christopher Francis Wakefield (born 11 October 1991) is an English former first-class cricketer.

Wakefield was born at Hammersmith in October 1991. He was educated at Wellington College and St Benedict's School, before going up to Leeds Metropolitan University. While studying at Leeds, he played two first-class cricket matches for Leeds/Bradford MCCU against Sussex and Yorkshire in 2015. Playing as a wicket-keeper, he scored 7 runs in his two matches and took 4 catches.

References

External links

1991 births
Living people
People from Hammersmith
People educated at Wellington College, Berkshire
People educated at St Benedict's School, Ealing
Alumni of Leeds Beckett University
English cricketers
Leeds/Bradford MCCU cricketers